Luis Rierola (1896 – 1 September 1970) was a Spanish field hockey player. He competed in the men's tournament at the 1928 Summer Olympics.

References

External links
 

1896 births
1976 deaths
Spanish male field hockey players
Olympic field hockey players of Spain
Field hockey players at the 1928 Summer Olympics
Field hockey players from Barcelona